Poznań Junikowo railway station is a railway station serving the south west of the city of Poznań, in the Greater Poland Voivodeship, Poland. The station opened in 2007 and is located on the Warsaw–Kunowice railway. The train services are operated by Przewozy Regionalne and Koleje Wielkopolskie. At the station there is also a small freight yard for trains serving businesses in the area.

The station was built to replace a former station, about 1 km east of the site of the current station.

Train services
The station is served by the following service(s):

Regional services (R) Zielona Gora - Zbaszynek - Zbąszyn - Opalenica - Poznan
Regional services (KW) Zbaszynek - Zbąszyn - Opalenica - Poznan

Bus and tram services

Bus service 716 stops at the station. Other bus and tram services operate from Junikowo terminus, about 800 metres north of the station.

References

 This article is based upon a translation of the Polish language version as of January 2017.

External links
 

Railway stations in Poland opened in 2007
Junikowo
Railway stations in Greater Poland Voivodeship
Railway stations served by Przewozy Regionalne InterRegio